The Roman Catholic Metropolitan Archdiocese of Huancayo  is a Latin Metropolitan archdiocese in Peru's western Amazonian Junín Region.

Its cathedral episcopal see is Catedral de la Santísima Trinidad (dedicated to the Holy Trinity) in the city of Huancayo.

History 
 Established on 18 December 1944 as Diocese of Huancayo on territory split off from the Diocese of Huánuco
 Lost territory on 15 May 1585 to establish the Territorial Prelature of Tarma
 30 June 1966: Promoted as Metropolitan Archdiocese of Huancayo

Bishops

Ordinaries

Bishops of Huancayo
 Leonardo José Rodriguez Ballón, O.F.M. (1945-1946), appointed Archbishop of Arequipa
 Daniel Figueroa Villón (1946-1956), appointed Bishop of Chiclayo
 Mariano Jacinto Valdivia y Ortiz (1956-1966); see below

Archbishops of Huancayo
 Mariano Jacinto Valdivia y Ortiz (1966-1971); see above
 Eduardo Picher Peña (1971-1984), appointed Military Vicar and later Military Ordinary of Peru
 Emilio Vallebuona Merea, S.D.B. (1985-1991)
 José Paulino Ríos Reynoso (1995-2003), appointed Archbishop of Arequipa
 Cardinal Pedro Ricardo Barreto Jimeno, S.J. (2004–present)

Auxiliary bishop
Carlos Alberto Salcedo Ojeda, O.M.I. (2016-)

Ecclesiastical province 
Apart from the metropolitan archdiocese, its province comprises two suffragan dioceses
 Diocese of Huánuco
 Diocese of Tarma

See also
 Roman Catholicism in Peru

Sources and external links
 GCatholic.org, with incumbent biography links
 Catholic Hierarchy
 Diocese website

Roman Catholic dioceses in Peru
Roman Catholic Ecclesiastical Province of Huancayo
Christian organizations established in 1944
Roman Catholic dioceses and prelatures established in the 20th century